Bhoman Shah is a town and union council of Depalpur Tehsil in the Okara District of Punjab Province, Pakistan, it is located at 30°31'60N 73°39'0E.

References

Union councils of Okara District